Pruchya Isaro and Nuttanon Kadchapanan were the defending champions, but lost in the first round to Niels Desein and Gavin van Peperzeel.
Bai Yan and Riccardo Ghedin won the title, defeating Chen Ti and Li Zhe 6–2, 7–5.

Seeds

Draw

References
 Main Draw

Doubles
Chang-Sat Bangkok Open - Doubles
 in Thai tennis